St George's School Edgbaston is a non-selective private day school in Edgbaston, Birmingham, England for girls and boys aged 11 to 18. It is located near St George's Church and consists of a lower school, an upper school and a sixth form.

History
St George's School was founded as a charitable trust in 1999 as a result of the merger of two schools: Edgbaston Church of England College for Girls, founded in 1886 and Edgbaston College Preparatory School, founded at the end of the nineteenth century. The school is situated one mile from the centre of Birmingham and occupies a six-acre site.

The school has a Christian foundation which aims to embrace Christian values in everything the students do. Its ethos statement recognises that the school community reflects the multi-cultural diversity of Birmingham and that this has a significant influence on the way the school applies its Christian values.

School Organisation
It is divided into the lower school, including the Early Years Foundation Stage (EYFS) for the youngest children, and the upper school, including the sixth form.

References

External links
 
 Profile on the ISC website

Private schools in Birmingham, West Midlands
Educational institutions established in 1999
1999 establishments in England
Edgbaston